Ivchenko-Progress ZMKB (Zaporizhzhia Machine-Building Design Bureau "Progress" State Enterprise named after Academician O.H.Ivchenko), formerly OKB-478 and Ivchenko Lotarev, is a state design bureau that creates drafts and plans for aircraft engines in Zaporizhzhia, Ukraine whose products are widely used in both civil and military aircraft, most notably by Antonov, Beriev, Ilyushin, Tupolev, Mil and Yakovlev. The design bureau works closely with Motor Sich, the turbine manufacturer located in Zaporizhzhia which produces those engines.

Polish manufacturer PZL-Mielec used the Progress ZMKB AI-25TL engine in the PZL M15 cropduster. Both the largest plane in the world, the Antonov An-225 Mriya and the largest helicopter, the Mil Mi-26, are powered by Progress/Lotarev engines.

The bureau is administered by the Ukrainian Defense Industry and the Ministry of Industrial Policy.

History
The Company has been involved for 60 years in the design of engines to power aircraft and helicopters of various types, and  also designs drives and special equipment for industrial applications.

Three notable designers have led the development during this time:

 1945–1968: Oleksandr Heorhiiovych Ivchenko (Oleksandr Georgijovych Ivchenko)
 1968–1989: Volodymyr Oleksiyovych Lotaryev (Volodmyr Oleksijovych Lotarev)
 1989-2010: Fedir Mykhailovych Muravchenko
 2010-: Ihor Fedorovych Kravchenko

Initially General Oleksandr Ivchenko designed piston engines. These engines were denoted AI. Work on their first turbine engine, the TS-12, began in 1953. Since the beginning of the 1960s the company have been developing bypass gas turbine engines. Under the direction of Volodymyr Lotarev, the organization developed the first operational Soviet high-bypass turbofans, the Lotarev D-36 in 1971.

This organization is now known as Ivchenko-Progress ZMKB and is based in Ukraine. Their engines are being operated successfully by numerous airlines around the world, including Volga-Dnepr, Antonov Airlines, Enimex, and Polet.

In January 2015, Diamond Aircraft of Austria announced the first flight of the Diamond DA50-JP7 powered by a 465 hp AI-450S turboprop engine developed by Ukraine's Motor Sich JSC and Ivchenko-Progress.

Turkish strategic drone Akinci is powered by these engines and flies up to 40,000 feet.

Production
True to the Soviet tradition, design is kept separate from production. Many of the bureau's designs were or are produced at Motor Sich, located at Zaporizhzhia International Airport.

Related real estates

Zaporizhzhia Oblast
 Sanatorium "Slavutych" in Andriivka (Mykhailivka rural municipality, Vilnyansk Raion)
 Beach resort "Perl" near Prymorsk

Products

Turbofans
 Ivchenko AI-25
 Lotarev DV-2
 Progress AI-22
 Progress AI-222
 Ivchenko-Progress AI-322
 MS-400

High-bypass turbofans
 Lotarev / Progress D-18T
 Lotarev D-36
 Progress D-436

Propfans
 Progress D-27
 Progress D-236

Turboprops
 Ivchenko AI-20
 Ivchenko AI-24
 Ivchenko-Progress Motor Sich AI-450S / S2
 MS-14
 MS-500

Turboshafts
 Lotarev D-136 / Ivchenko AI-136
 MS-500V

Turbojets
 Ivchenko AI-7

Reciprocating engines
 Ivchenko AI-4
 Ivchenko AI-10
 Ivchenko AI-14
 Ivchenko AI-26

See also
 Motor Sich
 Zorya-Mashproekt, another engine design bureau in Mykolaiv

References

External links

 Ivchenko-Progress homepage
 https://web.archive.org/web/20101206002205/http://www.zmkb.com/
 http://www.janes.com/articles/Janes-Aircraft-Component-Manufacturers/Ivchenko-Progress-ZMKB-Ukraine.html Ivchenko Progress ZMKB at janes.com

 
Companies based in Zaporizhzhia
Defence companies of Ukraine
Ukroboronprom
Gas turbine manufacturers
Science and technology in Zaporizhzhia
Industrial design firms
Design companies of Ukraine
Design bureaus
Aircraft engine manufacturers of Ukraine
Ukrainian brands